Semibalanus is a genus of barnacles, comprising four species. It is the only genus in the subfamily Semibalaninae.

Species
These species belong to the genus Semibalanus:
 Semibalanus balanoides (Linnaeus, 1767) (northern acorn barnacle)
 Semibalanus cariosus (Pallas, 1788) (thatched barnacle)
 Semibalanus madrasensis (Daniel, 1958)
 Semibalanus sinnurensis (Daniel, 1962)

References

Archaeobalanidae
Maxillopoda genera
Taxa named by Henry Augustus Pilsbry